The  Denver Broncos season was the team's 30th year in professional football and its 20th with the National Football League (NFL). The head coach was Dan Reeves while Chan Gailey was the offensive coordinator and Wade Phillips was the defensive coordinator. The season ended with the Broncos being blown out 55-10 in Super Bowl XXIV by the San Francisco 49ers.

Offseason

NFL draft

Personnel

Staff

Roster

Regular season
One of Denver's new major additions was rookie running back Bobby Humphrey, who rushed for 1,151 yards, caught 22 passes for 156 yards, and scored 8 touchdowns. Humphrey gave the Broncos a powerful running attack that they lacked in their previous Super Bowl seasons. The defense had a new weapon as well: rookie free safety Steve Atwater. Together with veteran defensive backs Dennis Smith, Wymon Henderson and Tyrone Braxton, the Broncos secondary combined for 14 interceptions.  Braxton lead the team with 6, which he returned for 103 yards and a touchdown, while also recovering 2 fumbles.  Another new addition was defensive end Ron Holmes, who recorded 9 sacks.  Holmes, along with veteran linebackers Karl Mecklenburg (7.5 sacks and 4 fumble recoveries) and Simon Fletcher (12 sacks) gave Denver one of the top defensive lines in the AFC.

Veteran receiver Vance Johnson had the best season of his career, catching 76 passes for 1,095 yards and 7 touchdowns, while also returning 12 punts for 118 yards. However, quarterback John Elway played inconsistently during the regular season, throwing just as many interceptions as touchdowns (18) and recording only a 73.7 passer rating.

Schedule

Note: Intra-division opponents are in bold text.

Game summaries

Week 2

Week 3

Playoffs

Standings

References

External links
Denver Broncos – 1989 media guide
 1989 Denver Broncos at Pro-Football-Reference.com

Denver Broncos
American Football Conference championship seasons
Denver Broncos seasons
AFC West championship seasons
Denver Broncos